The following individuals are the current general authorities of the Church of Jesus Christ of Latter-day Saints. Individual hierarchical positions and some of current specialized assignments in the church, if any, are listed.

General authorities

First Presidency 

 Council on the Disposition of the Tithes
 Boards of Trustees/Education of the Church Educational System

Quorum of the Twelve Apostles 

 Council on the Disposition of the Tithes
 Boards of Trustees/Education of the Church Educational System
 Area assignment
 Other assignments, where known (including committees, councils, or in any other capacity).

Presiding Bishopric

Total years as General Authority
Total years in Presiding Bishopric
Total years served in current Presiding Bishopric
Council on the Disposition of the Tithes
Other assignments (where known)

Presidency of the Seventy

 Date called to be a seventy and the date called as a member of the Presidency of the Seventy
 Years served as a general authority seventy
 Boards of Trustees/Education of the Church Educational System
 Other assignments, where known

General Authority Seventies
Those listed in this section are members of the First or Second Quorum of the Seventy. While each is assigned to a specific quorum, that affiliation is no longer being made public, with all General Authority Seventies being referred to with that generic designation.

 Date first sustained to First or Second Quorum of Seventy or called to be General Authority Seventies (where Quorum affiliation is not known). Dates taken from lds.org.       Those marked with * were Area Seventies prior to call as General Authorities.
 Current assignments.

Emeritus
Emeritus General Authorities are General Authorities who have been released from their positions in the hierarchy. They remain General Authorities until their deaths. All current emeritus General Authorities are former members of the First and Second Quorums of the Seventies or of the Presiding Bishopric.

When the first General Authorities were given emeritus status, N. Eldon Tanner of the First Presidency provided the following explanation:

"The very rapid growth of the Church across the world, with the attendant increase in travel and responsibility, has made it necessary to consider a change in the status for some of the Brethren of the General Authorities. Some of our associates have served for many years with complete and unselfish dedication, and they deserve every honor and recognition for such devoted service. It is felt advisable at this time to reduce somewhat the load of responsibility that they carry.
"After a long period of prayerful consideration and counsel, extending, indeed, over several years, we announce a new and specific status to be given from time to time to Brethren of our associates in the General Authorities. We announce that some Brethren have been designated as emeritus members of the First Quorum of the Seventy. These Brethren are not being released but will be excused from active service. It is out of consideration for the personal well-being of the individuals, and with deep appreciation for their devoted service, that this designation will be given from time to time to designated members of the General Authorities."

 Date called as a general authority.
 Date granted general authority emeritus status.
 Years as general authority (not including time as an emeritus).

See also

 List of area seventies of the Church of Jesus Christ of Latter-day Saints
 List of general officers of the Church of Jesus Christ of Latter-day Saints

Notes

References
 Download Updated 2021 Chart of General Authorities and General Officers, Newsroom, churchofjesuschrist.org, 16 April 2021. Retrieved 4 August 2021.
 First Presidency Announces 2021 Area Leadership Assignments, Church News, Newsroom, churchofjesuschrist.org, 19 April 2021. Retrieved 4 August 2021.

List
General
General